David Poritzky was an officer of Seattle-based Taiga Productions and the co-Executive Producer of VladiROCKstok '96, the first major international music festival to be held in Vladivostok, Russia.  He founded the first corporate-sponsored youth athletics leagues in Vladivostok, the Primorski Youth Soccer League and the Primorski Youth Basketball League.

Poritzky later served as director of operations and director of business development for Eurasia Group, an independent research firm in New York City, and then Bloomberg New Energy Finance, a division of Bloomberg LP.

References

 
 

Living people
1971 births
21st-century American businesspeople